The Super Tour of Misia: Girls Just Wanna Have Fun is a concert tour by Japanese singer Misia, held to celebrate her 20th anniversary as a recording artist. The tour, comprising four arena dates, began on April 7, 2018 at the Osaka-jō Hall in Osaka, and concluded three weeks later on April 28, 2018, at Yokohama Arena in Yokohama.

Background
On September 26, 2017, Misia announced four arena shows scheduled for 2018, to commemorate her 20th anniversary as a musical act. A website with details concerning the concert tour was opened on October 10, 2017. On November 1, 2017, the premium "luxury" seats available to Club MSA members were announced as sold out. The first pressing of the DVD and Blu-ray of the Misia Summer Soul Jazz 2017 tour included a pre-sale access code which allowed fans to purchase tickets in advance of the public on-sale scheduled to start on February 10, 2018. On March 9, 2018, Misia announced a partnership with au to offer limited tickets and merchandise to au smartpass subscribers. On March 12, 2018, it was announced that tickets for the two Osaka-jō Hall shows as well as the April 28, 2018 Yokohama Arena concert had sold out.

On March 8, 2018, an embargo on tour details was lifted and the first round of tour members were announced; Yoshie of Be Bop Crew, who last toured with Misia nine years ago on The Tour of Misia Discotheque Asia, will join as choreographer and dancer. The entire cast of dancers and band members were announced on April 6, 2018.

On April 1, 2018, it was announced that The Super Tour of Misia finale will be broadcast on Wowow on July 7, 2018, in conjunction with a documentary chronicling Misia's most recent passage in Nairobi, Kenya, titled Nonfiction W, and a BBC Earth program, narrated by Misia, on white rhinoceros conservation, titled BBC Earth 2018 Dangerous Life: The Last White Rhino, as part of a three-show bundle.

Set list
This set list is representative of the concert on April 28, 2018. It does not represent all concerts for the duration of the tour.

"Into the Light"
"Kimi no Soba ni Iru yo"
"Hi no Ataru Basho"
"Kuruzo Thrilling" ("It's Coming, Thrilling")
"Mekubase no Blues" ("The Winking Blues")
"Lady Funky"
"Orphans no Namida"
"Aitakute Ima"
"Snow Song"
"Tobikata o Wasureta Chiisana Tori" ("The Little Bird That Forgot How to Fly")
"Everything"
"Believe"
"Shiawase o Forever"
"The Glory Day"
"Super Rainbow"
"Hope & Dreams"
"Maware Maware"
Encore
"Anata ni Smile :)"
"Luv Parade"
"Tsutsumikomu Yō ni..."
Double Encore
"Kiss Shite Dakishimete" ("Kiss and Hold Me")

Notes:
On the two shows in Osaka, "Shiawase o Forever" was omitted from the set list.
On the April 7 and April 27 shows, "Kiss Shite Dakishimete" was omitted from the set list.

Shows

Personnel

Band
 Misia – lead vocals
 DJ Emma – DJ
 Tohru Shigemi - keyboards
 Takeshi Ohbayashi - keyboards
 Takuya Kuroda - trumpet
 Shuhei Yamaguchi - guitar
 Rashaan Carter - bass
 Tomo Kanno - drums
 Keita Ogawa - percussions
 Craig Hill - sax
 Akihiro Nishiguchi - sax
 Geila Zilkha - backing vocals
 Tiger - backing vocals
 Hanah Spring - backing vocals

Orchestra
 Gen Ittetsu – first violin
 Cameroun Maki – first violin
 Daisuke Kadowaki – first violin
 Yoko Fujinawa – first violin
 Takuya Mori – second violin
 Yuko Kajitani – second violin
 Kaoru Kuroki – second violin
 Yuki Nakajima – second violin
 Shoko Miki – viola
 Cristina Fujita – viola
 Toshiyuki Muranaka – cello
 Kirin Uchida – cello

Dancers
 Yoshie - dancer, choreographer
 Yuko Yano - dancer
 Mizuki - dancer
 Mika Nishimura - dancer
 Calin - dancer
 Haruna Yamanaka - dancer
 Tomohiko Tsujimoto - choreographer
 Show-Ya - dancer
 Hina - dancer
 Sae Kodama - dancer
 Naomi Shimotsukasa - dancer
 Kurumi - dancer
 Haruka - dancer
 Maya - dancer
 Mao Jintoku - dancer
 Kasumi Sakurai - dancer
 Rion - dancer
 Kou Yamamoto - dancer
 Maika Fujii - dancer
 Saaya Takaoka - dancer
 Kenken - dancer

References

External links
 

2018 concert tours
Misia concert tours
Concert tours of Japan